Loxodera is a genus of African plants in the grass family.

 Species
 Loxodera bovonei (Chiov.) Launert - Zaïre, Zambia
 Loxodera caespitosa (C.E.Hubb.) B.K.Simon - Tanzania, Zambia, Zimbabwe
 Loxodera ledermannii (Pilg.) Launert - Benin, Niger, Nigeria, Cameroon, Uganda
 Loxodera rhytachnoides (Launert) Clayton - Angola
 Loxodera strigosa (Gledhill) Clayton - Sierra Leone

References

External links
 Grassbase - The World Online Grass Flora

Andropogoneae
Poaceae genera
Flora of Africa